Steven Mukwala (born 15 July 1999) is a Ugandan professional footballer who plays as a striker for Ugandan club Uganda Revenue Authority FC. He played Vipers SC and loaned at Maroons FC of Uganda Premier League.

Career

Club

In January 2017, it was announced that Mukwala would be joining Vipers SC top flight club in Uganda, Vipers SC in what was reported to be an initial a great deal taking him from Masaza football to champions of Ugandan football Vipers.

In 2018, Mukwala was called up for the Uganda U23 National Team to play against Ghana and Cameroon where he scored one goal and was also part of the Uganda Squad that took part in the COSAFA Championships in Lesotho and he managed to help Uganda finish 3rd behind Egypt having scored 3 goals.

In February 2017, Mukwala  was part of the Vipers Squad that won the Azam Uganda Premier League and was much in the plans of Miguel Da Costa the coach of Vipers by then who had built trust in him after scoring crucial goals for the team in the quest for the title of 2017.

In 2019, Mukwala was loaned at Maroons FC for the new season 2019-2020 where he has scored 13 goals and one of the league top scorers with five games to go in the Uganda Premier League. His speed and power to finish the ball has caught the eye of many other clubs but giving first priority to his mother Club Vipers SC.

References

External links 

1999 births
Living people
Vipers SC players
Maroons FC players
Ugandan footballers
Association football forwards
Uganda international footballers